The Sorbs, also known as White Serbs in Serbian historiography, were an Early Slavic tribe settled between Saale-Elbe valley up to Lusatian Neisse (in present-day Saxony and Thuringia), and part of the Wends. In the 7th century, the tribe joined Samo's Empire and part of them emigrated from their homeland White Serbia to the Balkans. The tribe is last mentioned in the late 10th century, but its descendants are an ethnic group of Sorbs and Serbs.

Etymology

They are mentioned between the 6th and 10th century as Cervetiis (Servetiis), gentis (S)urbiorum, Suurbi, Sorabi, Soraborum, Sorabos, Surpe, Sorabici, Sorabiet, Sarbin, Swrbjn, Servians, Zribia, and Suurbelant. It is generally considered that their ethnonym *Sŕbъ (plur. *Sŕby) originates from Proto-Slavic language with a appellative meaning of a "family kinship" and "alliance", while other argue a derivation from Iranian-Sarmatian language.

History

7th century

According to the old theorization by Joachim Herrmann, the Serbian tribe characterized by Leipzig group pottery arrived from the Middle Podunavlje in the beginning of the 7th century and settled between Saale and Elbe river, but only since the 10th century their ethnonym was transferred to the Luzici, Milceni and other tribes of Sukow-Dziedzice and Tornow group who supposedly were present from the 6th century. It was also argued that West of former were present some Slavs with Prague-Korchak culture. However, since 1980s  Herrmann's theory is outdated and rejected by modern archaeologists and other scholars because it was found to be completely unfounded and based on wrong data and chronologies among others, with Peter Heather concluding that it is an "old theory" with seriously erroneous dating of the ceramics and sites, which in reality date to the 8th and 9th century. According to him, the archaeological data and historical sources indicate a Slavic migration along the Carpathians and the Alps since the 6th century with Korchak-type material.

It is considered that their earliest mention is at least from the 6th century or earlier by Vibius Sequester, who recorded Cervetiis (Servetiis) living on the other part of the river Elbe which divided them from the Suevi (Albis Germaniae Suevos a Cerveciis dividiit). 
According to one theory such an early mention is related to possible westward migration of Alanic tribe of Serboi with the Huns, who later subjugated Slavic population giving it their name. According to Lubor Niederle, the Serbian district was located somewhere between Magdeburg and Lusatia, and was later mentioned by the Ottonians as Ciervisti,  Zerbisti, and Kirvisti. According to a minor theory their area of settlement possibly also included part of Chebsko, the northwestern edge of the Czech Republic. The information by Vibius Sequester is in accordance with the Frankish 7th-century Chronicle of Fredegar according to which the Surbi lived in the Saale-Elbe valley, having settled in the Thuringian part of Francia at least since the second-half of the 6th century and were vassals of Merovingian dynasty. The Saale-Elbe line marked the approximate limit of Slavic westward migration. Fredegar recounts that under the leadership of dux (duke) Dervan (Dervanus dux gente Surbiorum que ex genere Sclavinorum), they joined the Slavic tribal union of Samo, after Samo's decisive victory against Frankish King Dagobert I in 631. Afterwards, these Slavic tribes continuously raided Thuringia. The fate of the tribes after Samo's death and dissolution of the union in 658 is undetermined, but it is considered that subsequently returned to Frankish vassalage. 

According to 10th-century source De Administrando Imperio, writing on the Serbs and their lands previously dwelt in, they lived "since the beginning" in the region called by them as Boiki (Bohemia) which was a neighbor to Francia, and when two brothers succeeded their father, one of them migrated with half of the people from White Serbia to the Balkans during the rule of Eastern Roman Emperor Heraclius (610–641) in the first half of the 7th century. This account is related to Fredegar's as the revolt against the Avars after the Siege of Constantinople (626) coincides with the period of Heraclius, when Byzantine Empire was also in crisis and likely used the Slavs against the Avars in the Western frontier of the Empire. It is considered that they arrived as a small military elite which managed to organize other already settled and more numerous Slavs, but the Serbs most probably did not fight the Avars as there's no evidence and mention of it in historical sources. According to some scholars, the White Serbian Unknown Archon who led them to the Balkans was most likely a son, brother or other relative of Dervan.

8th century
In 782, the Sorbs, inhabiting the region between the Elbe and Saale, plundered Thuringia and Saxony. Charlemagne sent Adalgis, Worad and Geilo into Saxony, aimed at attacking the Sorbs, however, they met with rebel Saxons who destroyed them.

In 789, Charlemagne launched a campaign against the Wiltzi; after reaching the Elbe, he went further and successfully "subjected the Slavs". His army also included the Slavic Sorbs and Obotrites, under Witzan. The army reached Dragovit, who surrendered, followed by other Slavic magnates and chieftains who submitted to Charlemagne.

9th century

The Sorbs ended their partial vassalage to the Franks (the Carolingian Empire) and revolted, invading Austrasia; Charles the Younger launched a campaign against the Slavs in Bohemia in 805, killing their dux, Lecho, and then proceeded crossing the Saale with his army and killed rex (king) Melito (or "Miliduoch") of the Sorabi or Siurbis, near modern-day Weißenfels, in 806. The region was laid to waste, upon which the other Slavic chieftains submitted and gave hostages. The rebellious Sorbs were compelled in 816 to renew their oaths of submission.

In May 826, at a meeting at Ingelheim, Cedrag of the Obotrites and Tunglo of the Sorbs were accused of malpractices; they were ordered to appear in October, after Tunglo surrendered his son as hostage and was allowed to return home. The Franks had, sometime before the 830s, established the Sorbian March, comprising eastern Thuringia, in easternmost East Francia.

In 839, the Saxons fought "the Sorabos, called Colodici" at Kesigesburch and won the battle, managing to kill their king Cimusclo (or "Czimislav"), with Kesigesburch and eleven forts being captured. The Sorbs were forced to pay tribute and forfeited territory to the Franks. The Sorbian tribe of Colodici was furthermore mentioned in 973 (Coledizi pagus,  Cholidici), in 975 (Colidiki), and 1015 (Colidici locus). Besides Colodici other tribes which scholars consider part of the narrow Sorbian alliance were Daleminzi-Glomacze, Chudzicy, Nieletycy, Nudzice, Susłowie, Żytyce among others.

The mid-9th century Bavarian Geographer mentioned the Surbi having 50 civitates (Iuxta illos est regio, que vocatur Surbi, in qua regione plures sunt, que habent civitates L). Alfred the Great in his Geography of Europe (888–893) relying on Orosius, recorded the Servians; "To the north-east of the Moravians are the Dalamensae; east of the Dalamensians are the Horithi, and north of the Dalamensians are the Servians; to the west also are the Silesians. To the north of the Horiti is Mazovia, and north of Mazovia are the Sarmatians, as far as the Riphean Mountains".

It is considered that in the second-half of the 9th century, Svatopluk I of Moravia (r. 871–894) may have incorporated the Sorbs into Great Moravia.

10th century
The Arab historians and geographers Al-Masudi and Al-Bakri (10th and 11th century) writing on the Saqaliba mentioned the Sarbin or Sernin living between the Germans and the Moravians, a "Slavic people much feared for reasons that it would take too long to explain and whose deeds would need much too detailed an account. They have no particular religious affiliation". They, like other Slavs, "have the custom of burning themselves alive when a king or chieftain dies. They also immolate his horses". In the Hebrew book Josippon (10th century) are listed four Slavic ethnic names from Venice to Saxony; Mwr.wh (Moravians), Krw.tj (Croats), Swrbjn (Sorbs), Lwcnj (Lučané or Lusatians).

Between 932 and 963 the Sorbs lost their independence. Henry the Fowler had subjected the Stodorane in 928, and in the following year imposed overlordship on the Obotrites and Veletians, and strengthened the grip on the Sorbs. Bishop Boso of St. Emmeram (d. 970), a Slav-speaker, had considerable success in Christianizing the Sorbs.

In the 10th century the region came under the influence of the Duchy of Saxony, starting with the 928 eastern campaigns of King Henry the Fowler, who conquered the Sorbs and Milceni (Upper Lusatia) by 932. Gero II, Margrave of the Saxon Eastern March, reconquered Lusatia the following year and, in 939, murdered 30 Sorbian princes during a feast. As a result, many Sorbian uprisings followed. The March of Lusatia was established in 965, remaining part of the Holy Roman Empire, while the adjacent Northern March was again lost in the Slavic uprising of 983. The later Upper Lusatian region of the Milceni lands up to the Silesian border at the Kwisa river at first was part of the Margraviate of Meissen under Margrave Eckard I. A reconstructed castle, at Raddusch in Lower Lusatia, is the sole physical remnant from this early period. These are the last mentions of the tribe.

Aftermath

Since then the Sorbian tribes disappeared from the political scene. From the 11th to the 15th century, agriculture east of Elbe River developed and colonization by Frankish, Flemish and Saxon settlers intensified. The Slavs were allowed to live mainly in the periphery of the cities, and the military-administrative as well as religious authority was in the hands of the Germans. Despite the long process of Germanization, part of the Slavs living in Lusatia preserved their identity and language until now, and in the early 20th century there lived some 150 thousand Lusatian Sorbs.

Organization
According to Rostyslav Vatseba, "between the Elbe and Saale rivers the heterachical dryht-type state existed during the reign of Miliduch (before 806). The local society of the White Serbs was of clan character, which indicates the beginnings of state formation. The Sorbian 'civitates' are equal to simple chiefdoms, the particular clan regions correspond with complex chiefdoms. The high king ('rex supérbus') had only hegemonic authority over the heads of the clan regions ('ceteri reges'). Later on in the 9th & early 10th century the political unity of the Sorbi region was lost, despite of presumably more hierarchical mode of government in the Colodici's principality of Czimislav (830s). The author suggests that Colodici's 'castellа' served as places of the high prince's dryht members ('witsessen') residence, providing the ability to control the neighbouring clans. Such a system presumably could have persisted to the times of Čestibor".

Rulers

 Other notable people

 Ludmila of Bohemia (c. 860 – 921)
 Albrecht I of Meissen (12th century)

See also
Origin hypotheses of the Serbs
Genetic studies on Serbs

References

Secondary sources
 Paul M. Barford (2001). The Early Slavs: Culture and Society in Early Medieval Eastern Europe. Cornell University Press. ISBN 9780801439773
 Sebastian Brather (2001; 2nd ed. 2008). Archäologie der westlichen Slawen: Siedlung, Wirtschaft und Gesellschaft im früh- und hochmittelalterlichen Ostmitteleuropa. Walter de Gruyter. ISBN 9783110206098
 S. Brather (2004). "The beginnings of Slavic settlement east of the river Elbe". Antiquity, Volume 78, Issue 300. pp. 314–329
 S. Brather (2011). "The Western Slavs of the Seventh to the Eleventh Century – An Archaeological Perspective". History Compass, 9(6), pp. 454–473
 S. Brather (2020). "Germanic or Slavic? Reconstructing the Transition from Late Antiquity to the Early Middle Ages in East Central Europe". Interrogating the “Germanic”, De Gruyter, pp. 211–224, ISBN 9783110699760

 

 Mats Roslund (2007). Guests in the House: Cultural Transmission between Slavs and Scandinavians 900 to 1300 AD. BRILL. ISBN 9789047421856

Primary sources
Chronicle of Fredegar, 642
Royal Frankish Annals, 829
Bavarian Geographer, mid-9th-century
Annales Fuldenses, 901

Sorbian people
West Slavic tribes
Lusatia
History of Saxony
Slavic ethnic groups